George Rex (July 25, 1817 – March 27, 1879) was a Democratic politician in Wooster in the U.S. State of Ohio who was in the Ohio Senate and was an Ohio Supreme Court Judge 1874–1877.

Biography
George Rex was born in Canton, Ohio to Jacob and Catherine Rex, members of the Methodist Church who emigrated from Cumberland County, Pennsylvania and settled in Canton in 1815. As a boy, he attended the Lutheran Seminary in Canton for one and one half years, when that school moved to Columbus, Ohio and became Capital University. He studied there for two more years, and returned home the winter of 1833–1834 without graduating. He taught school in Canton, studied law, and was admitted to the bar October 10, 1842.

Rex moved to Wooster, Ohio February 9, 1843, where he practiced law. He was elected Prosecuting Attorney of Wayne County in 1847 and re-elected in 1849. He was elected to represent the 28th district in the Ohio Senate in 1851, and served in the 50th General Assembly in 1852 and 1853. In 1859 and 1861, he was again elected Prosecuting Attorney of Wayne County, and appointed to fill a vacancy in that position in 1864. In 1867, he again was elected to the Ohio Senate for the 58th General Assembly of 1868–1869.

On September 11, 1874, Governor Allen appointed Rex to the Ohio Supreme Court, to fill a vacancy when Walter F. Stone resigned. He ran for the remainder of the term that autumn, and defeated Republican William Wartenbee Johnson. His term on the bench expired February 9, 1877. Rex refused re-nomination in the fall of 1876, and returned to Wooster and his private practice.

Rex was married to Ella J. McCurdy of Wooster on May 24, 1853. They raised one child, a daughter. Rex was a Freemason. He was a member of the Ebenezer Lodge and the Wooster Chapter of the Ancient Order of Freemasonry. As a Freemason, he served the Grand Lodge of Ohio as Grand Master in 1861 and 1862.

George Rex died at Wooster on March 27, 1879, or March 26. He was buried at Kime's Corner Cemetery, a family cemetery in Congress Township, Wayne County, Ohio. Another source says he was buried at Wooster Cemetery, section 9, lot 252, with Masonic honors.

Notes

References

External links

Ohio lawyers
Justices of the Ohio Supreme Court
Politicians from Canton, Ohio
1817 births
1879 deaths
Masonic Grand Masters
Capital University alumni
Democratic Party Ohio state senators
County district attorneys in Ohio
Presidents of the Ohio State Senate
People from Wooster, Ohio
19th-century American politicians
19th-century American judges
19th-century American lawyers